The Ministry of National Defence of the Republic of Lithuania was established in 1990. Its mission, according to its website, consists of: "Implementation of joint policy with NATO, cooperation with foreign countries in defence sector, representation of Lithuania by coordination of international humanitarian law, management of national defence and security financial resources, army provision with armament, equipment and other resources, implementation of personnel management policy, preparation of military reserve, administration of compulsory military draft, preparation of society for civil resistance, planning national mobilisation."

Ministers

References

External links
 

 
Lithuania
National Defence
Lithuania
Lithuania